This article summarizes equations in the theory of fluid mechanics.

Definitions

Here  is a unit vector in the direction of the flow/current/flux.

Equations

See also

Defining equation (physical chemistry)
List of electromagnetism equations
List of equations in classical mechanics
List of equations in gravitation
List of equations in nuclear and particle physics
List of equations in quantum mechanics
List of photonics equations
List of relativistic equations
Table of thermodynamic equations

Sources

Further reading

 
 
 
 

Physical quantities
SI units
Physical chemistry
Equations of physics